Marcel Čermák (born 25 November 1998) is a Czech professional footballer who plays as a midfielder for Dynamo České Budějovice.

Career

At the age of 17, Čermák trialed for Dutch top flight side PEC Zwolle.

In 2017, he was sent on loan to Viktoria Žižkov in the Czech second division from the youth academy of Slavia Prague, one of the Czech Republic's most successful clubs.

In 2019, he signed for Aluminij in Slovenia.

On 2 January 2023, Čermák returned to his native Czech Republic to join Dynamo České Budějovice on a contract until June 2025.

References

External links
 
 

Living people
1998 births
Czech footballers
Association football midfielders
Czech Republic youth international footballers
Footballers from Prague
FK Viktoria Žižkov players
NK Aluminij players
SK Dynamo České Budějovice players
Czech National Football League players
Slovenian PrvaLiga players
Czech expatriate footballers
Czech expatriate sportspeople in Slovenia
Expatriate footballers in Slovenia
1. FK Příbram players